The Bacillaceae-1 RNA motif is a conserved RNA structure identified by bioinformatics within bacteria in the family bacillaceae.  The RNA is presumed to operate as a non-coding RNA, and is sometimes adjacent to operons containing ribosomal RNAs.  The most characteristic feature is two terminal loops that have the nucleotide consensus RUCCU, where R is either A or G.  The motif might be related to the Desulfotalea-1 RNA motif, as the motifs share some similarity in conserved features, and the Desulfotalea-1 RNA motif is also sometimes adjacent to ribosomal RNA operons.

References

External links
 

Non-coding RNA